Camp Manitou is a summer camp, year-round outdoor recreation facility, and non-profit charitable organization located in Headingley, Manitoba, Canada, just outside Winnipeg. It is operated by the True North Youth Foundation, a subsidiary of True North Sports & Entertainment.

Camp Manitou was founded in 1930 by a group of six service clubs in Winnipeg: Rotary, Cosmopolitan, Kiwanis, Kinsmen, Optimist, and the YMCA, with the Lions Club joining in 1953. It was incorporated as a non-profit charitable organization in 1949 with the mission to provide a camping experience for underprivileged/at-risk children and youth.

History
Camp Manitou was founded in 1930 by a group of six service clubs in Winnipeg: Rotary, Cosmopolitan, Kiwanis, Kinsmen, Optimist, and the YMCA, with the latter operating the camp until 1997.

It was incorporated as a non-profit charitable organization in 1949 with the mission to provide a camping experience for underprivileged/at-risk children and youth. The Lions Club soon joined the organization in 1953.

The True North Youth Foundation, a subsidiary of True North Sports & Entertainment, entered into a long-term lease and operating agreement that eventually led to the foundation assuming the operations of Camp Manitou as of January 2nd, 2014.

Location and facilities
Camp Manitou is located west of Winnipeg in a bend in the Assiniboine River on Green Oaks Lane in Headingley, Manitoba, Canada.

The camp facilities include a main lodge with a commercial kitchen, dining room/multipurpose room, and bedrooms able to accommodate 72 sleepers; a gym building; six cabins which house nature education programs, music programs, games, and crafts; a swimming pool; and 28 acres of land. Some activities at the camp include zipline, mountain biking, canoeing, archery, orienteering, crafts, field games, water games, and swimming. During the summer camp programs, activities are run by trained Camp Manitou Activity Leaders. In the off-season, rental groups may rent equipment for their use.

Funding

Camp Manitou is a non-profit charitable organization, and strives to provide subsidized, affordable rates to its non-profit user groups. As such, rental revenues cover only a small portion of the costs to run the facilities and programs. The remaining funds must be raised through grants, corporate sponsorship, private donations, special events, and other fundraising initiatives.

Camp Manitou does not receive operational funding from the municipal, provincial, or federal governments.

References

External links
 

True North Sports & Entertainment
Headingley, Manitoba
Summer camps in Canada